Adam Henein (31 March 1929 – 22 May 2020) was an Egyptian sculptor.

Early life
Samuel Henein was born into a family, originally from Asyut, of gold metalworkers in Cairo in 1929. He was trained as a sculptor at the Academy of Fine Art in Cairo, from which he received his degree in 1953. His family were Coptic Christians.

Career 
Henein became known as a sculptor in the 1950s; he received the Luxor prize in 1954–56, and his work was shown in Cairo, Alexandria, and Munich by the end of that decade. When he moved to Paris in 1971, Henein began to explore painting. In both his paintings and his sculptures, he gained recognition for the use of ancient Egyptian themes and traditional materials.

From 1989 to 1998 Henein headed the design team involved in the restoration of the Great Sphinx of Giza, drawing on his experience as a sculptor to determine how the monument was originally carved. In 1998 he was decorated for his service by the Egyptian government.

After having lived for almost a quarter of a century in Paris, Henein returned to live in the country of his birth. For over a decade, he produced a number of unique granite sculptures. It was in Aswan, a city that since Antiquity has been famous for its granite quarries, that Henein established the International Sculpture Symposium, of which he was the director from 1996. He was awarded the State Award for the Arts in 1998 and the Mubarak Prize in 2004. He represented Egypt in the Venice Biennale.

He was the founder and director of the annual international sculpture symposium in Aswan, and this position, for which he was known internationally. Henein has had one-person exhibitions in Alexandria, Amsterdam, Cairo, London, Nantes, Munich, Paris and Rome. He participated in group exhibitions in Cairo, Calais, Casablanca, Dakar, Ljubliana, Naples, Sorrento and Spoleto. His commissioned works are in public buildings in Egypt, Italy and Saudi Arabia. Henein resided in Cairo, Egypt. His work was also showcased at New York’s Metropolitan Museum of Art.

Henein received Egypt’s State Medal, the State Merit Award, and the Mubarak Award in art. He also established the International Granite Sculpture Symposium in Aswan. El-Shorouk Publishing House and Skira Publishing Group published a complete book about his life and works.

Personal 
He converted to Isalm in 1961 when he met his wife, Afaf el Dib; he changed his name to Adam. Henein died on 22 May 2020, he was 91 years old.

Adam Henein Museum
The Adam Henein Museum, which opened Saturday 18 January 2014 in Cairo's Al-Harraniya district, is a priceless gift from the artist himself to the country.

It features the artist's "life of creativity" and includes the largest, and ever-growing, collection of Henein’s sculptures as well as some of his paintings.

Throughout the years his body of work is the way in which the artist interweaves universal themes—motherhood, birds, boats and prayer among them—with references to Egyptian icons such as pyramids, obelisks, Pharaonic kings and hieroglyphs.

See also
List of Egyptians
Ramses Wissa Wassef

References 

Encyclopedia of Modern Art and the Arab World 
© Bibliotheca Alexandrina  
rose issa projects

External links
Adam Henein museum

Artists from Cairo
1929 births
2020 deaths
20th-century Egyptian sculptors